Cameron Sims (born January 6, 1996) is an American football wide receiver for the Washington Commanders of the National Football League (NFL). He played college football at Alabama and signed with Washington as an undrafted free agent in 2018.

Early life and college
Sims was born on January 6, 1998, in Monroe, Louisiana. He attended Ouachita Parish High School in Ouachita Parish, Louisiana, where he played on their football team as a Tight End.  Sims was considered a four-star recruit and committed to play college football at Alabama, where he played from 2014 to 2017. He was used sparingly his first two seasons before becoming a contributor during his junior and senior seasons.

Professional career

After not being selected in the 2018 NFL Draft, Sims signed with the Washington Redskins as an undrafted free agent on May 2, 2018. He suffered a season ending ankle injury in the first game of the 2018 season against the Arizona Cardinals, and was placed on injured reserve.

On August 31, 2019, Sims was waived by the Redskins and was signed to the team's practice squad the following day. He was promoted to the active roster on October 2, 2019. Sims was released by the team on October 19, 2019, but re-signed to the practice squad two days later. He was signed to the active roster on November 16, 2019.

He was waived by Washington on September 5, 2020, but signed with their practice squad the following day. He was elevated to the active roster for the team's first two games of the season against the Philadelphia Eagles and Arizona Cardinals, and was promoted to the active roster on September 22, 2020.

Sims recorded his first career touchdown in a Week 6 game against the New York Giants in 2020. Sims caught three passes for a career-high 110 yards in Week 9 against the Giants, the first 100-plus yard game of his career. Sims had five receptions for 92 yards in a Week 13 win against the Pittsburgh Steelers. Sims finished the 2020 regular season with 32 receptions for 477 yards and one receiving touchdown. Sims made his playoff debut in the Wild Card round against the Tampa Bay Buccaneers and was the team's leading receiver, catching seven passes for 104 yards.

Washington placed a restricted free agent tender on Sims on March 16, 2021, which he signed a week later. In Week 11 of the 2021 season, he recorded his second career receiving touchdown in a 27–21 win over the Carolina Panthers. In the Week 14 loss to the Dallas Cowboys, he had three receptions for 69 yards and a 43-yard touchdown from Taylor Heinicke. On December 15, 2021, Sims was placed on the COVID-19 reserve list, but was reactivated four days later.

Sims re-signed with the team to a one-year deal on March 17, 2022.

References

External links

Washington Commanders bio
Alabama Crimson Tide bio

1996 births
Living people
African-American players of American football
Alabama Crimson Tide football players
American football wide receivers
Players of American football from Louisiana
Sportspeople from Monroe, Louisiana
Washington Redskins players
Washington Football Team players
Washington Commanders players
21st-century African-American sportspeople